Walt Whitman High School is a public high school in Bethesda, Maryland, United States. It honors American poet Walt Whitman. The school serves grades 9-12 for the Montgomery County Public Schools.

In 2022, U.S. News & World Report ranked the school as the best high school in Maryland, #104 nationwide, and #1 in Montgomery County Public Schools High Schools.

History
The school opened in the fall of 1962 with 1,418 students. Designed by local architectural firm McLeod, Ferrara & Ensign, it was built on 17 levels, with a central courtyard and a geodesic dome for its gymnasium. A Ford Foundation grant underwrote the design and construction of the dome.

In 1981, the school added a 1,176-seat auditorium. In 1992, the school demolished the geodesic dome and all other buildings except the auditorium, and constructed a new school building, which opened in the fall of 1993.

In 2021, the school completed a  addition, including 18 new classrooms, which opened in the fall of 2021.

Extracurricular activities

The school has an active FIRST Robotics Competition team.

Publications
The Black & White is the school's student-run newspaper. The National Scholastic Press Association Hall of Fame inducted the paper in 1991. Whitman is also notable for having the country's only student-run psychology journal. The journal circulates to over 1,000 psych teachers around the country.

Athletics
Whitman fields sports teams in the fall, winter, and spring. The school competes as the Vikings and is part of Montgomery County public school sports. The football field is named after long-time principal Jerome Marco.

The school has won 11 soccer state championships, including two back-to-back titles in 2018-2019. In 2021, the girls' soccer team won the state championship.

In 2006, the boys' team defeated Eleanor Roosevelt 39-38 to win the school's only state title. That season, Whitman leading scorer Michael Gruner was named co-gazette player of the year alongside NBA superstar Kevin Durant.

The boys' tennis team has also won state titles in 2009, 2014, and 2019.

The girls' basketball team won the state title in 2016, their second overall.

Notable alumni

Yasmeen Abutaleb, journalist and New York Times best-selling author
Chris Anderson, journalist
Chris Bliss, juggler/comedian
Andrea Carroll, operatic soprano 
Alex Chappell, journalist
Kahane Cooperman, filmmaker
Anthony Dilweg, National Football League (NFL) quarterback
David Dobkin, director
Michael Dunn, NFL offensive lineman
Susan Dynner, filmmaker
Michael Eisen, biologist
Andrew Feinberg, journalist
Debra Granik, filmmaker
Mark Halperin, journalist
Pamela Harris, federal judge
Spike Jonze, filmmaker
Orde Kittrie, law professor
Ryan Kuehl, NFL defensive tackle
Brooke Lierman,  Maryland House of Delegates
Jon Miller, television executive
David Moon, Maryland House of Delegates
Mark Moores, member of the New Mexico Senate
David Nevins, television producer
Ashley Parker, journalist
Eric Pierpoint, actor
Mark Pryor, U.S. Senator, Arkansas
Mitchell Rales, entrepreneur
Steven M. Rales, entrepreneur
Giuliana Rancic, television personality
Alexandra Robbins, author
Kate Seelye, reporter
Dan Shanoff, sports journalist
Eric Steinberg, actor

References

External links
 Walt Whitman High School website

Schools in Bethesda, Maryland
Public high schools in Montgomery County, Maryland
Educational institutions established in 1962
1962 establishments in Maryland